Paramount Country Club (founded 1948) is a private country club located near New City, New York, on the site of Mountain View Farm, the former home of Paramount Pictures founder Adolph Zukor. It features an 18-hole golf course designed by golf course architect A.W. Tillinghast.

History
Paramount Country Club is located on land originally bought by Paramount Pictures founder Adolf Zukor in 1918, from Lawrence Abraham. Zukor expanded this estate, commissioning noted golf course architect A.W. Tillinghast to build an eighteen-hole golf course on the property, which opened in 1920.

Following the reorganization of Paramount Pictures in 1936, Zukor was not able to continue maintaining the Mountain View Farm estate as a private property, and so opened it for membership as the Mountain View Golf and Country Club. In 1948, he sold the property, which became the Dells Golf and Country Club and then Dellwood Country Club. In 2011 the club changed its name to Paramount Country Club, "a name which better reflects the rich history of the club."

The course was redesigned by William F. Mitchell in 1951 and Robert Trent Jones in 1956. In 2013, the golf course was completely renovated by Jim Urbina.

Paramount Country Club's Golf Course was voted as having the Best U.S. Private Renovation in the January 2014 issue of Golf Magazine.

Facilities
As well as the 18-hole championship golf course, Paramount Country Club has other sporting facilities, such as 12 har-tru tennis courts and an olympic-sized swimming pool.

Club Professionals

The head Golf Professional at Paramount Country Club is Sean Siblano. The head Tennis Professional is Lauren Gebbia.

References

Time Magazine, January 14, 1929 Volume XIII Number 2, page 26

External links
Paramount Country Club
Jim Urbina Renovation/Paramount CC

Golf clubs and courses in New York (state)
Golf clubs and courses designed by A. W. Tillinghast
Buildings and structures in Rockland County, New York